William Henry Walenn (7 January 1828 – 20 September 1896) was born in London and was trained as an engineer at the works of Messrs. Cottam, and received part of his education at University College, London, where he studied mathematics under Augustus De Morgan. He became a Fellow of the Chemical Society in 1866, and of the Institute of Chemistry soon after its establishment. He was also a member of the Physical Society of London.

Biography
Walenn's wife, Skene Charlotte (née Barth) was musically trained but did not perform professionally. Nevertheless, her interest led to music professions of several of her children: Herbert Walenn was a cellist and professor at the Royal Academy of Music; Charles Walenn was a singer; another son was an organist, and Gerald Walenn and a daughter were violinists. Two other children found their way into art professions, and a daughter, Isabella, married the designer Arthur Silver.

Walenn was one of the earliest abridgers of specifications to the Patent Office, beginning under the then Comptroller, Mr. Woodcroft, for whom he compiled the Series of Abridgments relating to "Electricity and Magnetism," "Photography," and other subjects. In 1866, his book, Little Experiments for Little Chemists, was published, and in it was given a new process for depositing brass upon zinc. In 1871, he contributed a paper to the Philosophical Magazine, "On Solutions for Depositing Copper and Brass by means of Electric Force", and about the same time he conducted some experiments for the Government in electro-deposition of copper upon the bottom of an iron ship.

Between 1868 and 1880, several mathematical papers of Walenn's, on "Unitates" and methods of checking calculations by means of these, were published in the Phil. Mag. He died at his residence, 9 Carleton Road, Tufnell Park, on 20 September 1896, after a long illness.

See also
 History of electromagnetic theory

References

 Journal of the Chemical Society, Volume 71, Part 2. Chemical Society (Great Britain), Bureau of Chemical Abstracts (Great Britain). The Society (1897), p. 1206.

1828 births
1896 deaths
British chemists
Alumni of University College London
Fellows of the Chemical Society